Nørholm, also called Nørholmen, is a manor house and agricultural property on  in the municipality of Grimstad in Agder county, Norway. The estate best known because one of its owners was Nobel Prize-winning author Knut Hamsun.

History
Nørholm was one of the more notable and historic farms of the traditional district Agder. The manor historically belonged to noble families often of Danish origin.

The property was bought by Knut Hamsun in 1918, and since then has been owned by members of the Hamsun family. The financial award associated with the Nobel Prize made it possible for Knut Hamsun to expand the property significantly, and to live a life as farmer, much like the protagonist of his novel Growth of the Soil which had earned him the Nobel Prize in Literature. The current main building is from 1830, but was expanded by Hamsun in a neoclassical style. He also built several roads on the property.

Nørholm conservation was established in 1989 through the will of Ellinor (1915-1987), the daughter of Knut Hamsun and Marie Hamsun. The Nørholm Foundation (Stiftelsen Nørholm) was created in 1995 by Victoria Hamsun, the daughter of Arild Hamsun (1914-1988) who was Knut and Marie's youngest son. The property is managed by Victoria Hamsun in cooperation with the Nørholm Foundation.  The Sørvika cottage was separated from the property and owned by Knut's son, Tore.  That property was sold in 2011 and is no longer owned by the family or the foundation.

References

Houses completed in the 19th century
Buildings and structures in Agder
Grimstad
Historic farms in Norway
Farms in Agder
Neoclassical architecture in Norway
Houses in Norway
Manor houses in Norway
Knut Hamsun